The Taifa of Mértola was a medieval Islamic Moorish taifa that existed in what is now southeastern Portugal. It existed during three distinct periods: from 1033 to 1044, from 1144 to 1145, and from 1146 to 1151. From 1044 until 1091 it was under the forcible control of the Taifa of Seville, by Abbad II al-Mu'tadid. Its short-lived history ended in 1151, when it was finally conquered by the Almohad Caliphate.

List of Emirs

Abbadid dynasty
Abbad II al-Mu'tadid:1033-1044
Becomes part of Seville: 1044–1091 (Abbadid Family)

Almoravid dynasty
To Almoravid dynasty: 1091–1144

Qasid dynasty
Abu-l-Qasim Ahmad ibn al-Husayn ibn Qasi: 1144–1145, d. 1151
To Badajoz: 1145–1146
Abu-l-Qasim Ahmad ibn al-Husayn ibn Qasi (restored): 1146–1151
To Almohads: 1151–1250

References

See also
 List of Sunni Muslim dynasties
Taifa of Zaragoza
Taifa of Seville
Taifa of Cordoba

1151 disestablishments
States and territories established in 1033
Mertola
11th century in Portugal
12th century in Portugal
Taifas in Portugal
History of Alentejo
Mértola